Pšata is a small village south of Domžale in the Upper Carniola region of Slovenia.

Church

The local church is dedicated to Saint Peter.

References

External links

Pšata on Geopedia

Populated places in the Municipality of Domžale